Foshan Haitian Flavouring & Food Co. Ltd is a Chinese public company that manufactures sauces and flavourings. It is the largest manufacturer of soy sauce in the world.

Operations
It is based in Guangdong. The chairman is Pang Kang. Sales in 2012 were around seven billion yuan.

In 2010 it held 16 to 19 percent of the Chinese soy sauce market. Its major competitors included Kikkoman and Lee Kum Kee. The company also manufactures other sauces and condiments such as oyster, hoisin, shrimp and vinegar.

History
The company was established in the seventeenth century as a group of sauce factories in Foshan.

In 2007 it was bought out by its employees from the government of Foshan. In 2014 it underwent an IPO on the Shanghai Stock Exchange in order to raise funds for expansion. The company raised 3.84 billion yuan after selling 74.85 million shares.

See also
 List of Chinese sauces

References

Companies based in Foshan
Companies established in the 17th century
Food and drink companies of China
Food and drink companies established in the 17th century
Condiment companies of China
Soy product brands
Chinese sauces